Sheikhupur is a village in Shaheed Bhagat Singh Nagar district of Punjab State, India. The village is administrated by Sarpanch an elected representative of the village.

Demography 
As of 2011, Sheikhupur has a total number of 429 houses and population of 2209 of which 1055 include are males while 1154 are females according to the report published by Census India in 2011. The literacy rate of Sheikhupur is 78.19% higher than the state average of 75.84%. The population of children under the age of 6 years is 251 which is 11.36% of total population of Sheikhupur, and child sex ratio is approximately 859 as compared to Punjab state average of 846.

Most of the people are from Schedule Caste which constitutes 42.69% of total population in Sheikhupur. The town does not have any Schedule Tribe population so far.

As per the report published by Census India in 2011, 652 people were engaged in work activities out of the total population of Sheikhupur which includes 602 males and 46 females. According to census survey report 2011, 90.03% workers describe their work as main work and 9.97% workers are involved in Marginal activity providing livelihood for less than 6 months.

Education 
KC Engineering College and Doaba Khalsa Trust Group Of Institutions are the nearest colleges.

List of schools nearby
Govt Upper Primary School, Katt
Govt Upper Primary with Secondary School, Khan Khana (girls only)
Govt Primary School, Khan Khana (boys only)
Govt Upper Primary School, Sotran

Transport 

See also 
List of villages in India

References

External links 
 Tourism of Punjab
 Census of Punjab
 Locality Based PINCode

Villages in Shaheed Bhagat Singh Nagar district